Too Wise Wives is a 1921 American silent drama film directed by Lois Weber, written by Lois Weber and Marion Orth, and starring Louis Calhern, Claire Windsor, Phillips Smalley, and Mona Lisa. It was released on May 22, 1921, by Paramount Pictures. A copy of the film is in the Library of Congress.

Plot
As described in a film magazine, David Graham (Calhern) is the husband of Marie (Windsor), a wife whose great love leads her to too careful safeguarding of her husband's happiness. Sara Daily (Lisa), a former sweetheart, is the wife of John Daily (Smalley), a wealthy man whose love she retains by methods more subtle than sincere. Sara attempts to regain the adulation of David, but Marie intercepts her letter of invitation, precipitating a dramatic situation that does not develop into disaster only because Marie does not open the letter. As a result of the exposure of intentions, both wives are taught a new and better understanding of family obligations with an ending happy for all concerned.

Cast 
Louis Calhern as Mr. David Graham
Claire Windsor as Marie, Mrs. David Graham
Phillips Smalley as Mr. John Daly
Mona Lisa as Sara, Mrs. John Daly

References

External links 

 

Film stills at clairewindsor.weebly.com

1921 films
1920s English-language films
Silent American drama films
1921 drama films
Paramount Pictures films
Films directed by Lois Weber
American black-and-white films
American silent feature films
1920s American films